Chamod Silva (born 24 February 1995) is a Sri Lankan cricketer. He made his List A debut for Polonnaruwa District in the 2016–17 Districts One Day Tournament on 21 March 2017.

References

External links
 

1995 births
Living people
Sri Lankan cricketers
Kalutara Town Club cricketers
Polonnaruwa District cricketers
Cricketers from Colombo